This is a list of open-air and living history museums in the United States.

Ecological and environmental living museums

Farm museums 
Alabama
Landmark Park, Dothan

Alaska
Alaska Native Heritage Center, Anchorage

California
Antique Gas & Steam Engine Museum, Vista, San Diego
California Citrus State Historic Park, Riverside
Orcutt Ranch Horticulture Center, Los Angeles
 Rileys Farm, Oak Glen, 17th and 18th c. Living History, Revolutionary War, Civil War & Gold Rush
Stein Family Farm / National City Living History Farm Preserve, San Diego

Colorado
Littleton Museum – The Farms, Littleton

Florida
Mission San Luis de Apalachee, Tallahassee
Morningside Nature Center, Gainesville
Panhandle Pioneer Settlement Living History Museum, Blountstown

Georgia
Agrirama, Tifton
Historic Westville, Columbus

Hawaii
Kona Coffee Living History Farm, Kona District

Illinois
 Blackberry Farm, Aurora
Corron Farm, Campton Hills
Garfield Farm and Inn Museum, Campton Hills
Kline Creek Farm, West Chicago
Lincoln Log Cabin State Historic Site, Charleston
Lincoln's New Salem State Historic Site, Springfield
Naper Settlement, Naperville
Peck Farm Park, Geneva
Primrose Farm, St. Charles Township
Volkening Heritage Farm, Schaumburg
Wagner Farm, Glenview, Cook County

Indiana
Amish Acres Historic Farm & Heritage Resort, Nappanee
Buckley Homestead Living History Farm, Lowell
Conner Prairie, Fishers
 Historic Tunnel Mill, Charlestown
Lincoln Boyhood National Memorial, Lincoln City
Prophetstown State Park, Battle Ground

Iowa
Living History Farms, Urbandale
Ushers Ferry Historic Village, Cedar Rapids

Kansas
Old Cowtown Museum, Wichita

Kentucky
Mountain Homeplace, Staffordsville
Shaker Village of Pleasant Hill, Mercer County

Maine
Norlands Living History Center, Livermore

Maryland
Carroll County Almshouse and Farm, Westminster
National Colonial Farm, Accokeek
Oxon Cove Park and Oxon Hill Farm, Oxon Hill

Massachusetts
Old Sturbridge Village, Sturbridge
Pioneer Village, Salem
Plimoth Patuxet Museums, Plymouth
Spencer-Peirce-Little Farm, Newbury
Waters Farm, Sutton
Hancock Shaker Village, Pittsfield

Michigan
Colonial Michilimackinac, Mackinaw City, Michigan
Greenfield Village, Dearborn
White Pine Village, Ludington, Michigan

Minnesota
Gammelgarden Museum of Scandia
Heman Gibbs Farmstead, Falcon Heights
The Landing, Shakopee
Oliver Kelley Farm, Elk River

Nebraska
Stuhr Museum of the Prairie Pioneer, Grand Island
Wessels Living History Farm, York

New Hampshire
New Hampshire Farm Museum, Milton
Strawbery Banke, Portsmouth

New Jersey
Historic Cold Spring Village, Cape May
Historic Longstreet Farm, Holmdel
Fosterfields Living Historical Farm, Morristown
Howell Living History Farm, Titusville
Liberty Hall (New Jersey)
Old Barracks Museum Trenton, New Jersey
Scansen173 

New Mexico
New Mexico Farm and Ranch Heritage Museum, Las Cruces
El Rancho de las Golondrinas, Santa Fe County

New York
Erie Canal Village, Rome
Farmers' Museum, Cooperstown
Genesee Country Village and Museum, Mumford
Mabee Farm Historic Site, Rotterdam Junction
Muscoot Farm, Somers
Museum Village, Monroe
Old Bethpage Village Restoration, Old Bethpage, Long Island
Queens County Farm Museum, Glen Oaks, Queens
Storm King Art Center, Mountainville
Tilly Foster Farm Museum, Brewster

North Carolina
Carl Sandburg Home National Historic Site, Flat Rock
Clemmons Educational State Forest, Clayton
Cradle of Forestry in America, Brevard
Bethabara Historic District, Winston-Salem
Holmes Educational State Forest, Hendersonville
Horne Creek Living Historical Farm, Pinnacle
Jordan Lake Educational State Forest, Apex
Latta Plantation, Huntersville
Long Valley Farm at Carvers Creek State Park, Spring Lake
Rendezvous Mountain State Park, Purlear
Turnbull Creek Educational State Forest, Elizabethtown
Tuttle Educational State Forest, Lenoir

North Dakota
Frederick A. and Sophia Bagg Bonanza Farm, Richland County

Ohio
Gorman Heritage Farm, Evendale
Hale Farm and Village, Bath Township, Summit County
Heritage Village Museum, Sharonville
Malabar Farm State Park, Richland County
Sauder Village, Archbold
Robbins Crossing Historic Village, Nelsonville, Ohio

Oregon
B Street Living Permaculture Museum, Pacific University
, Springfield
Dufur Historical Society Living History Museum, Dufur
High Desert Museum, Bend
 Philip Foster Farm on the Oregon Trail Eagle Creek
Schreiber Log Cabin, Dufur
Sherwood Heritage Center, Sherwood

Pennsylvania
Colonial Pennsylvania Plantation, Edgmont Township, Delaware County

Rhode Island
Casey Farm, Saunderstown
Coggeshall Farm Museum, Bristol
Watson Farm, Jamestown

South Carolina
Kings Mountain State Park, Blacksburg

Tennessee
Exchange Place – Gaines Preston Farm, Kingsport
The Homeplace, Land Between the Lakes
Museum of Appalachia, Norris

Texas
Barrington Living History Farm, Washington-on-the-Brazos

Utah
This Is the Place Heritage Park, Salt Lake City
American West Heritage Center, Wellsville
Wheeler Historic Farm, Murray

Virginia
Chippokes State Park, Surry
Claude Moore Colonial Farm, McLean
Colonial Williamsburg, Williamsburg
Frontier Culture Museum of Virginia, Staunton
Matthews Living History Farm Museum, Independence

Washington
Pomeroy Living History Farm, Yacolt

West Virginia
Heritage Farm Museum and Village, Huntington
Watters Smith Memorial State Park, Harrison County

Wisconsin
Old World Wisconsin, Eagle
Stonefield (Wisconsin), Cassville, Wisconsin

Living transportation museums 

 Allegheny Portage Railroad National Historic Site
 California State Railroad Museum, Sacramento, California
 Cole Palen's Old Rhinebeck Aerodrome, Red Hook, New York
 National Museum of Transportation, St Louis County, Missouri
 Railtown 1897 State Historic Park, Jamestown, California
 San Francisco Cable Car Museum, San Francisco, California
 Seashore Trolley Museum, Kennebunkport, Maine
 Steamtown National Historic Site, Scranton, Pennsylvania
 Travel Town Museum, Los Angeles, California
 Western America Railroad Museum, Barstow, California
 Western Railway Museum, Solano County, California

Military forts and posts 

The list of forts lists both historical, preserved and currently operational military posts.  Not all are open to the public.  Some of those open to the public will have living history guides.

Battery Gunnison, a US Army Coast Artillery Battery at Fort Hancock, New Jersey, is being restored to its 1943 configuration by the Army Ground Forces Association, a non-profit living history organization, and is open for tours throughout the year.

Renaissance faires

Other open-air and living history museums 

Arizona
 Pioneer Living History Museum, Phoenix
 Sharlot Hall Museum, Prescott

Arkansas
 Ozark Folk Center, Mountain View

California

 Bodie State Historic Park, Bodie
 Calico Ghost Town, San Bernardino County
 Casa del Herrero, Montecito
 Columbia State Historic Park, Columbia
 Empire Mine State Historic Park, Grass Valley
 Fort Ross State Historic Park, Fort Ross
 Hearst Castle State Historic Park, San Simeon
 Heritage Square Museum, Montecito Heights, Los Angeles
 La Purísima Mission State Historic Park, Lompoc
 Leonis Adobe Museum, Calabasas
 Los Angeles Plaza Historic District, Los Angeles
 Los Encinos State Historic Park, Encino, Los Angeles
 Marshall Gold Discovery State Historic Park, Placerville
 Monterey State Historic Park, Monterey
 Old Sacramento State Historic Park, Sacramento
 Riley's Farm & Living History Destination, Oak Glen
 San Dieguito Heritage Museum, Encinitas
 San Juan Bautista State Historic Park, San Juan Bautista
 Santa Susana Pass State Historic Park, Chatsworth, Los Angeles
 Virginia Robinson Gardens, Beverly Hills
 Watts Towers, Watts, Los Angeles
 Will Rogers State Historic Park, Pacific Palisades, Los Angeles

Colorado
 Bent's Old Fort National Historic Site, Otero County
 Fort Uncompahgre Living History Museum, Delta
 Four Mile Historic Park, Denver
 Rock Ledge Ranch Historic Site, at Garden of the Gods, Colorado Springs
 South Park City, Fairplay
 Cross Orchards Grand Junction

Connecticut
Mystic Seaport, Mystic

Florida
 Bellevue Plantation, Tallahassee
 Castillo de San Marcos, St. Augustine
 Cracker Country, Tampa
 Fort Clinch State Park, Amelia Island
 Lake Kissimmee State Park, Lake Wales
 Mission San Luis de Apalachee, Tallahassee
 Silver River Museum, Marion County
 Yesteryear Village, on the South Florida Fairgrounds, Palm Beach County

Georgia
 Westville, Lumpkin

Hawaii
 Kona Coffee Living History Farm, Kona District
 Polynesian Cultural Center, Lā'ie

Illinois
 Lincoln Log Cabin State Historic Site, Charleston
 Lincoln's New Salem, Menard County
 Macktown Living History Education Center, Rockton
 Midway Village Museum, Rockford
 Naper Settlement, Naperville

Indiana
 Conner Prairie, Fishers
 Historic Tunnel Mill, Charlestown
 Lincoln Boyhood National Memorial, Lincoln City
 Spring Mill State Park, Mitchell

Iowa
 Living History Farms, Urbandale

Kansas
 Boot Hill Museum, Dodge City
 Old Cowtown Museum, Wichita
 Outdoor Museum, Abilene
 Shawnee Town 1929, Shawnee
 Green Elm School at the Crawford County Historical Museum, Pittsburg

Kentucky
 Adsmore, Princeton
 My Old Kentucky Home State Park, Bardstown
 Shaker Village of Pleasant Hill, Mercer County

Louisiana
 LSU Rural Life Museum, Baton Rouge
 Vermilionville Cajun and Creole Folklife Park, Lafayette

Maine
 Fort Western, Augusta
 Maine Forest & Logging Museum, living history site known as Leonard's Mills, Bradley
 Washburn-Norlands Living History Center, Livermore
 Willowbrook Museum Village, Newfield

Maryland
 Button Farm Living History Center, Germantown
 Historic London Town and Gardens, Edgewater 
 Historic St. Mary's City, St. Mary's City
 Jerusalem Mill, Kingsville

Massachusetts
 Hancock Shaker Village, Hancock
 Historic Deerfield, Deerfield
 Plimoth Patuxet Museums, Plymouth
 Old Sturbridge Village, Sturbridge

Michigan
Crossroads Village & Huckleberry Railroad, Flint, Michigan, Village (Michigan)
 Greenfield Village, Dearborn
 Historic Mill Creek State Park, Mackinaw City
 Michigan's Heritage Park, Whitehall

Minnesota

 Big Stone County Museum, Ortonville
 Dakota City Heritage Village, Farmington
 East Grand Forks Heritage Village, East Grand Forks
 Esko Historical Society Museum, Esko
 Fillmore County Historical Society Open-Air Museum, Fountain
 Forest History Center, Grand Rapids
 Gibbs Museum of Pioneer and Dakotah Life, Falcon Heights
 Forestville, Minnesota Fillmore County
 Jeffers Petroglyphs, Jeffers
 Nobles County Pioneer Village, Worthington
 Norman County Prairie Village, Ada
 Oliver Kelley Farm, Elk River
 Peder Engelstad Pioneer Village, Thief River Falls
 ‎Settler's Square Museum, Warren
 Snake River Fur Post, Pine City
 The Landing, Shakopee
 Traverse des Sioux, St. Peter
 Upper Sioux Agency State Park, Yellow Medicine County
 Village of Yesteryear, Owatonna

Missouri
 Faust Park Historic Village, Chesterfield
 Missouri Town 1855, Lee's Summit
 Shoal Creek Living History Museum, Kansas City

Montana
 Daniels County Museum & Pioneer Town, Scobey
 Nevada City Living History Museum, Virginia City

New Hampshire
 Fort at Number 4, Charlestown
 Strawbery Banke, Portsmouth

New Jersey
 Allaire Village, Wall Township
 Historic Cold Spring Village, Cape May
 Longstreet Farm, Holmdel Township

New York
 Buffalo Niagara Heritage Village, Amherst
 Erie Canal Village, Rome
 Fort Klock homestead, St. Johnsville
 Genesee Country Village and Museum, Mumford
 Hanford Mills Museum, East Meredith
 Heritage Village of the Southern Finger Lakes, Corning
 Historic Richmond Town, Richmondtown, Staten Island
 Islip Grange, Sayville
 Monument Park, The Bronx 
 Museum Village at Old Smith's Clove, Monroe
 Old Bethpage Village Restoration, Old Bethpage
 Old Stone Fort, Schoharie
 Weeksville Heritage Center, Brooklyn
 Aaron House of Niagara Falls, [Niagara Falls]

North Carolina

 Bethabara Historic District, Winston-Salem
 Dragon Fly Trail at Lake Norman State Park, Troutman
 Holly Discovery Trail at Lake James State Park, Nebo
 Hutchinson Homestead & Garden Creek Baptist Church at Stone Mountain State Park, Traphill
 Island Farm, Manteo, North Carolina
 Mountain Gateway Museum and Heritage Center, Old Fort
 Old Salem, Winston-Salem
 Piper-Cox House at Eno River State Park, Durham
 Roanoke Island Festival Park, Manteo
 Supple-jack Trail at Dismal Swamp State Park, South Mills

North Dakota
 Fort Union Trading Post National Historic Site, Yellowstone

Ohio
 Caesar's Creek Pioneer Village, Waynesville
 Hale Farm & Village, Bath
 Heritage Village Museum, Sharonville
 Ohio Village, Columbus
 Roscoe Village, along the former Ohio and Erie Canal, Coshocton

Pennsylvania
 Conrad Weiser Homestead, Womelsdorf
 Daniel Boone Homestead, Birdsboro
Depreciation Lands Museum, a Colonial Living History Village,  Pittsburgh
 Historic Hanna's Town
 Hopewell Furnace National Historic Site, Elverson
 Landis Valley Museum, Lancaster
 Oliver Miller Homestead, South Park Township
 Somerset Historical Center, Somerset
 Old Bedford Village, Bedford, PA 
 The Frick Pittsburgh
 Tour-Ed Mine
 West Overton Village
 Woodville

Rhode Island
 South County Museum, Narragansett

Tennessee
 Historic Collinsville, Clarksville
 Rocky Mount Museum, Piney Flats

Texas
 George Ranch Historical Park, Fort Bend County
 Gonzales Pioneer Village Living History Center

Vermont
 Shelburne Museum, Shelburne

Virginia
 Colonial Williamsburg, Williamsburg
 Frontier Culture Museum of Virginia, Staunton
 Henricus Historical Park, Chesterfield County
 Jamestown Settlement, Jamestown
 Mount Vernon, home of George Washington, including a working farm, grist mill and distillery
 Pamplin Historical Park, Petersburg

Washington
 Camlann Medieval Village, Carnation
 Fort Walla Walla, museum and pioneer village, Walla Walla

West Virginia
 Prickett's Fort State Park, Marion County

Wisconsin
 Forts Folle Avoine Historical Park, Danbury
 Galloway House and Village, Fond du Lac
 Heritage Hill State Historical Park, Allouez
 Little Norway, Blue Mounds
 Old World Wisconsin, Eagle
 Ozaukee County Pioneer Village, Saukville
 Pinecrest Historical Village, Manitowoc
 Pioneer Village Museum, Cameron
 Pioneer Park Historical Complex, Rhinelander
 Schumacher Farm County Park, Waunakee
 Wade House Historic Site
 Waswagoning Re-Created Ojibwe Village

Wyoming
 Museum of the American West, Lander

See also
List of tourist attractions providing reenactment
List of tourist attractions (worldwide)

Category: Historic districts in the United States by state

References

 
 
 
 
 
Museum
Open-air